The women's individual competition in aerobic gymnastics at the 2001 World Games in Akita was played from 17 to 18 August. The competition took place at Akita City Gymnasium.

Competition format
A total of 8 athletes entered the competition. Only final was held.

Results

References

External links
 Results on IWGA website

Men's individual